The Bicol false gecko (Pseudogekko sumiklab) is a species of gecko. It is endemic to the Philippines.

In fact, P. sumiklab is relatively new and found to be the only known member of the Pseudogekko brevipes species.

Habitat 
The Bicol false gecko was discovered at the bank of a stream, in a tree, at low elevation in a part of a secondary growth forest on Luzon Island.

References 

Pseudogekko
Reptiles described in 2017
Reptiles of the Philippines